Liston Douglas Barfield (born August 9, 1945) is an American politician. He is a member of the South Carolina House of Representatives from the 58th District, serving since 2001. He is a member of the Republican party. He also served from 1985 to 1989.

References

Living people
1945 births
Republican Party members of the South Carolina House of Representatives